North Park is a  county park in Allegheny County, Pennsylvania, United States. It is the largest in the county's 12,000 acre (49 km²) network of nine distinct parks.

Its swimming pool was one of the largest in the United States when it opened on July 5, 1937. It holds 2,225,000 gallons of water (compared to 20–30,000 gallons in a modern city swimming pool) and has enough room for 5,000 people to swim. The pool is 50m x 105m. The park also offers a golf course, large ice skating rink (completed in February 1961), movie theater, picnic groves, tennis courts, basketball courts, kayak rentals, a treetop obstacle course with zipline, and several miles of trails for walking, hiking, bike riding, and mountain biking--including trails for the visually impaired, known as the "Braille Trail". The Rachel Carson Trail runs through North Park, as well. North Park is also notable for their boathouse restaurant called "Over the Bar", which has a bicycle theme.

The Latodami Nature Center offers environmental education programs for school groups, scouts, and other private and public groups.

Further reading

References

External links

 North Park website
 Latodami Nature Center

Parks in the Pittsburgh metropolitan area
Parks in Allegheny County, Pennsylvania
Nature centers in Pennsylvania
Braille trail sites
1931 establishments in Pennsylvania
Protected areas established in 1931
County parks in the United States